Trial Run is a 1969 American drama television film directed by William Graham and produced by Jack Laird. The film stars James Franciscus, Diane Baker, Leslie Nielsen, and Janice Rule.

Cast
James Franciscus as Louis Coleman
Diane Baker as Carole Trenet
Leslie Nielsen as Jason Harkess
Janice Rule as Lucille Harkness
John Vernon as Leo D'Agosta
David Sheiner as Noel Ferguson
Fred Beir as Charles Andrews
Paul Carr as Tyler Peters
Lili Valenty as Mrs. Menderes
Jack Collins as Henry Wycoff
William Bramley as Karlson
Bartlett Robinson as Larkin
Vicki Medlin as Jeanne
Hazel Scott as Herself
Tim Matheson as Delivery person

External links
 
 

1969 television films
1969 films
American drama television films
NBC network original films
Films directed by William Graham (director)
1960s American films